Trà Khúc River is a river in Vietnam. It is the largest river in Quảng Ngãi Province.

It flows through the following places: 
Sơn Tây District
Sơn Hà District
Tư Nghĩa District
Sơn Tịnh District
Quảng Ngãi City

Much of it can be used as an inland waterway, extending inland far beyond Quảng Ngãi City into Sơn Hà District.

There is a hydroelectric station on the Trà Khúc River in the center of Quảng Ngãi Province. It is located near the border of Sơn Hà District with Tư Nghĩa District and Sơn Tịnh District.

References

Rivers of Quảng Ngãi province
Rivers of Vietnam